Count Ōtani Kōzui (大谷 光瑞, 27 December 1876 – 5 October 1948) was a Japanese Buddhist leader and explorer who was the 22nd Abbot of Nishi Hongan-ji and the head of the Honganji-ha sect of Buddhism. He is known for expeditions to Buddhist sites in Central Asia, such as Subashi. His Buddhist name was Kyōnyo (鏡如).

Career
Between 1902 and 1910, he financed three expeditions to Central Asia although his participation was stopped for his succession. Ōtani was a fellow of the Royal Geographical Society, and played host to several of his fellow Central Asian explorers, such as Sven Hedin and Albert von Le Coq. His collection, often called "Ōtani collection" is still considered important in Central Asian studies, although it is today scattered in Tokyo, Kyoto, China and Korea. In addition to his spiritual responsibilities and his Central Asian activities, Ōtani wrote about China, Manchuria and Chinese porcelain.  While playing the Great Game, British and Russian intelligence both suspected that his archaeological expeditions were little more than covers for espionage activities. Japan says they were solely investigations of the route along which Buddhism came to Japan, and had no political connections.

After his father Myonyo's death, he succeeded as Abbot of the Nishi Honganji in 1903. While he continued to sponsor the expeditions, he devoted himself to the modernization of the Jōdo Shinshū sect. His sponsorship, however, brought huge amounts of debt to his sect. A financial scandal forced him to abdicate in 1914. His nephew Shonyo became 23rd Abbot.

See also

1902 Ōtani expedition

References

Notes

Sources
 Hopkirk, Peter (1980). Foreign Devils on the Silk Road: The Search for the Lost Cities and Treasures of Chinese Central Asia. Amherst: The University of Massachusetts Press. .

1876 births
1948 deaths
Kazoku
People of Meiji-period Japan
Central Asian studies scholars
Place of birth missing
Place of death missing
Jōdo Shinshū Buddhist priests